Silver Dragon or Silver dragon may refer to:

Silver Dragon (coin), an East Asian silver coin
Metallic dragon#Silver dragon, a subclass of metallic dragon in Dungeons & Dragons
Tidal bores on the Qiantang River